Iceland sent a delegation to compete at the 2008 Summer Paralympics in Beijing. According to official records, the country was represented by five athletes in athletics, powerlifting and swimming. Their performance was considered satisfactory as two of them improved on their personal records.

Athletics 

2 competitors:

Men

Powerlifting 

1 competitor:

Men

Swimming 

2 competitors:

Men

Women

See also 
 2008 Summer Paralympics
 Iceland at the Paralympics
 Iceland at the 2008 Summer Olympics

References

External links 
 International Paralympic Committee

Nations at the 2008 Summer Paralympics
2008
Paralympics